"Blackberry Way" is a 1968 single by English band The Move. Written by the band's guitarist/vocalist Roy Wood and produced by Jimmy Miller, "Blackberry Way" was a bleak counterpoint to the sunny psychedelia of earlier recordings. It nevertheless became the band's most successful single, reaching number 1 on the UK Singles Chart in February 1969.

The Move vocalist Carl Wayne refused to sing on the song, so Wood handled the lead vocal. Richard Tandy, who later played keyboards with Wood's next band Electric Light Orchestra (ELO), played harpsichord on "Blackberry Way". Despite the success of the single, the style of psychedelia-tinged pop sat uneasily with guitarist Trevor Burton. He left the group shortly after.

The B-side, "Something", was specially written for the band by David Scott-Morgan.

Wood said in a 1994 interview that "Blackberry Way" is his favourite Move song of all time, commenting that it could have been performed in any era and still worked.

Personnel
The Move
Roy Wood – lead and backing vocals, guitar, sitar
Trevor Burton – bass, backing vocal
Bev Bevan – drums

Additional musicians
Richard Tandy – harpsichord
Uncredited - mellotron

Charts

Cover versions
In 1969 Italian band Equipe 84 produced a cover version (with Italian lyrics by lyricist Mogol), named "Tutta mia la città" ("All the town is mine"), which became a hit in Italy.
UK band The New Seekers covered this song on their 1971 album, Beautiful People.
Swiss band Gotthard covered this song on their 1999 album, Open.
UK alternative rock band The Wonder Stuff released a version of the song on one of their series of EPs titled From the Midlands with Love in 2012.
US classic rockers Cheap Trick included their version of the song as a bonus track on the deluxe version of their 2017 album We're All Alright!.

References

The Move songs
UK Singles Chart number-one singles
1968 singles
Baroque pop songs
Songs written by Roy Wood
Song recordings produced by Jimmy Miller
1968 songs
Regal Zonophone Records singles